Assyriska BK is a Swedish football club based in Västra Frölunda, Gothenburg. The club was formed in 1985 by Assyrian immigrants and is currently playing in Division 2 Västra Götaland which is the fourth tier of Swedish football. They play their home matches at Ruddalens IP in Västra Frölunda. Assyriska BK are affiliated to the Göteborgs Fotbollförbund.

History
The Assyrians who had settled in Gothenburg formed in 1976 the football club Göteborgs Assyriska Idrottsförening (GAIF) that was attached to the Assyriska Mesopotamiska Association in Gothenburg.

After a couple years of football experience they formed in 1985 Assyriska BK (ABK) as a sports division of the Assyriska Mesopotamiska Association in Gothenburg. ABK was reformed into an independent association and formed with the objective of promoting their sporting interests in the Assyrian Association in Gothenburg. The club has its base within the Assyriska Association of Västra Frölunda with over 1,000 members. Since their foundation Assyriska BK has participated mainly in the middle and lower divisions of the Swedish football league system. Over the years the club has expanded and has today several youth teams.

In 2016 Assyriska BK was promoted for the first time in the club history to Division 1 which is the third tier of Swedish football.

In 1985 Yousif Sifo played on the team and has held all scoring records.

Supporters
Assyriska BK's official fan club was formed in 2008 under the name Ultras Suryoye Göteborg, also known as USG.

Current squad
As of 19 February 2020.

Current staff
 Head coach:  Ahrun Çiçek''
 Assistant coach: George Kalyun Assistant coach: Daniel Stanisic Goalkeeper coach: Juan Ramon Physical Coach: Sohell Kassal'''

Season to season

See also
List of Assyrian-Syriac football teams in Sweden

References

External links
 Assyriska BK – official website

Assyriska BK
Assyrian football clubs
Assyrian/Syriac football clubs in Sweden
Football clubs in Västra Götaland County
Association football clubs established in 1985
1985 establishments in Sweden
Diaspora sports clubs